Dauti Dauti was born in 1960 in Kokaj, near Gjilan, in Kosovo. He graduated from the University of Pristina Faculty of Law. He continued post-graduate studies at the University of West London (former Thames Valley University) and was awarded a PhD from the University of Leeds School of History, on thesis: The British Foreign Policy and the Albanian Question 1876–1914.

After graduation from law school, he started his career as a journalist. His first articles were published in Bota e Re (New World) a student newspaper published by the University of Pristina. He went on to write for weekly magazine Zëri]and from 1994 until 1999 he was a London-based correspondent of the magazine.
   
From 1999 to 2001 he worked for the Institute for War and Peace Reporting in London as a journalist and editor. He established their Pristina office in 1999. In 2000 he was engaged in establishing the Association of Journalists of Kosovo and served as its general secretary until 2002. From 2000 to 2002 he was also an independent Member of the Central election Committee, a committee of the Organization for Security and Co-operation in Europe, which organised and oversaw the work of the first and free elections in Kosovo.

During 2002 he embarked on a research program at the Kettering Foundation in Dayton, Ohio. As an international fellow at Kettering he researched subjects in the fields of media and democracy, politics and traditional deliberation among the Albanians. Within this program he has published "Building an Independent Media in Kosovo" (English and Albanian) and "Assemblies and Ancient Deliberation according to Code of Lek Dukagjinit" (English and Chinese).

During 2005 he worked as a media adviser and government spokesman under Prime Minister Bajram Kosumi. From 2007 to 2010 he worked as a consultant for Albania and Kosovo in the media office of the International Organisation for Migration in London. During these years he continued working as a freelance journalist and independent media consultant. He has also debated the case of Kosovo and other Balkan issues in different media and international forums. In 1996/7 Dauti received his master's degree in European Studies from The University of West London - former Thames Valley University.

In 2017 Dauti got his Ph.D. from the University of Leeds - School of History. The title of his Ph.D. thesis was "Britain, the Albanian Question and the Demise of the Ottoman Empire 1876-1914". His area of academic interest and research is British foreign policy and the Balkans during the 19th and beginning of the 20th centuries.

Notable works
Dauti is author of these books:

.  (Anglo-Albanian reflections)
.  (The war for Trepça)
.  (European Union – from an idea to reality)
.  (Building an Independent Media in Kosovo)
. Assemblies and ancient deliberation according to code of Leke Dukagjini
. , 1877–1880 (The Albanian question inside the British diplomacy, 1877-1880)

References

External links 
New book about 19th century Albanian history by Daut Dauti
Ancient Public Deliberation and Assembly in the Code of Lekë Dukagjini, Daut Dauti

1960 births
Living people
People from Gjilan
Kosovan non-fiction writers
Kosovan journalists
Kosovan screenwriters
Kosovo Albanians
Albanian-language writers
University of Pristina alumni
Alumni of the University of West London
20th-century Albanian writers